Southeast University (SEU) is a public research university located in Nanjing, Jiangsu, China. It was formed from one of the oldest universities and the first coeducational university in China, and designated as a member of the Double First Class University Plan, Project 985, and Project 211, sponsored by the Ministry of Education of China aiming to develop into a world-class university.

Its precursor, Sanjiang Normal College, was established in 1902 as a modern university on the campus of an academy which dates back to 258. In 1921, the school changed its name to National Southeast University and became the second national university in China, and in 1928 was renamed to National Central University, the nation's flagship university. After the KMT government lost Nanjing to the Communist Party of China, the university was renamed as National Nanking University in August 1949. It was renamed Southeast University in May 1988.

Southeast University has been ranked among the top 20 research universities in China and the top 300 across the world. In the official subject ranking of 2012 conducted by the Ministry of Education of China, it has been ranked top 3 nationally in 8 fields including architecture, landscape architecture, urban planning, art history, civil engineering, electronic engineering, transportation engineering and biomedical engineering. SEU is a highly selective university that usually accepts top 2% students in the National College Entrance Examination of China.

History

The Imperial Nanjing School, the highest educational institution of kingdom, as the predecessor, was founded in CE 258 in the period of the Three Kingdoms. The imperial school enjoyed the same campus with the current Southeast University since the 14th year of Hongwu reign (CE 1381) in Ming dynasty.

Sanjiang Normal College (三江师范学堂) (1902–1905) 
At the end of the 19th century, under the domination of the Qing dynasty, the Chinese society was under the situation of domestic trouble and foreign invasion. 1901, the Qing government began to reform under this situation, and in 1902 issued 'The imperial rules for colleges', and adapted the new modern education system. On May, 30th of the same year, the Liangjiang governor Liu Kunyi submitted a document of preparing colleges to the Qing government, proposing to open normal college in Jiangning (Nanjing). In February 1903, the following Liangjiang governor Zhang Zhidong submitted a proposal to open Sanjiang Normal College to government, and authorize Miao Quansun as a representative to Japan for investigation, who later was nominated as the inspector of Sanjiang Normal College and responsible for the project preparation. In September 1903, Sanjiang Normal College officially opened.

Liangjiang Normal College (两江师范学堂) (1905–1911) 

Due to the ambiguous meaning of the college name which led to several disputes, the Sanjiang Normal College was named as Liangjiang Normal College in 1905. The year after, Li Ruiqing was nominated as the principal, who closed the junior normal subjects, and added the public subjects, professional subjects, and also created the first hand-painting subject in China. Until 1907, there had already been Geography-History department, Chinese-Foreign Language Department, Mathematic-Physics- Chemistry Department, and Agriculture Department. At the end of 1911, due to the outbreak of Xinhai Revolution, Liangjiang Normal College was almost closed.

National Nanjing Higher Normal School (南京高等师范学校) (1915–1923) 
On 15 July 1914, Governor Han Guojun appointed Jiang Qian as principal, who was responsible for the starting up of Nanjing Higher Normal School in the same site of Liangjiang Normal College. Jiang employed the US-educated scholar Guo Bingwen as the dean of teaching, Chen Rong as the advisor, and sent both to Europe to investigate the education system and recruit teachers. On 10 September 1915, Nanjing Higher Normal School was officially started. In December 1919, Nanjing Higher Normal School formally recruited 8 female students and 50 more female visiting students, being the first school in China allowing both females and males to study together. The Polytechnic Faculty was established by the school in 1916.

National Southeast University (国立东南大学) (1921–1924) 
In September 1918, Guo Bingwen was the president in the south division. On 7 April 1920, Guo proposed the foundation of the "Southeast University Preparatory Committee". In September, Guo proposed to the State Council and the Ministry of Education to apply for the establishment of Southeast University, and in December it was approved. On 6 June 1921, the Board of Southeast University was established, Guo as president, and the university was officially opening in September. In December, the school council decided that Nanjing Higher Normal School would be incorporated into Southeast University. Southeast University, based on the foundation of Nanjing Normal Higher School, until 1923, had possessed arts and sciences, Education, engineering, agriculture, business totaling more than 20 lines in 5 subjects. Based on the Polytechnic Faculty of Nanjing Higher Normal School, the Engineering School of National Southeast University was established in 1921.

National Hohai Technology University (河海工程专门学校) (1924–1927) 
In 1924, the Engineering School of National Southeast University merged with the water conservancy school Hohai Engineering School to form National Hohai Technology University, with Mao Yisheng as president.

National Central University (国立中央大学) (1927–1949) 
In 1927, National Hohai Technology University along with several other schools merged with National Southeast University to form National Central University.

National Nanjing University (国立南京大学) (1949–1952) 
In April 1949, the People's Liberation Army occupied Nanjing and the Nanjing Military Committee took over National Central University. On 8 August 1949, National Central University was renamed as National Nanjing University, and then Nanjing University in October 1950.

Nanjing Institute of Technology (南京工学院) (NIT, 1952–1988) 
In 1952, the People's Republic of China began a national adjustment of its colleges. In Nanjing, the adjustment was mainly on Nanjing University and University of Nanking. Nanjing Institute of Technology was formed in the original site of National Central University from the Engineering School (at the time, the biggest school) of Nanjing University and the engineering departments of University of Nanking, including Chemistry Department and Electrical Machine Department. Later there were also some relevant subjects from Jiaotong University, Zhejiang University, Shandong University, Xiamen University, Fudan University, and Private Jiangnan University merged into Nanjing Institute of Technology.

Southeast University (东南大学) (1988 – present) 
In June 1988, Nanjing Institute of Technology was renamed as 'Southeast University', starting to convert from a technology institute to a technology-featured comprehensive university. Since 2000, the name Nanjing Institute of Technology is used by a different institution.

In 2000, Nanjing Railway Medical College and two other schools were merged into Southeast University.

Academic

Southeast University is one of 32 universities directly administered by the Chinese Department of Education, which are considered the top class universities in China. The university has 16,000 undergraduate students and 10,000 graduate students in over 30 schools and departments. The admission to SEU is very competitive. Normally the university enrolls top 2% high school students from nationwide to its undergraduate programs, and top 5% undergraduate students to its graduate program. Most students are recruited by engineering or some big schools such as School of Mechanical Engineering, School of Energy & Environmental Engineering, School of Information Science & Engineering, School of Civil Engineering, School of Computer Science & Engineering, School of Economics & Management, as well as School of Transportation Engineering. The rest students are enrolled by some smaller schools and departments like School of Automation, School of Electronic Science, and Department of Physics.

There are about 5,600 faculty members in Southeast University. Among all the faculty members, there are 8 members of Chinese Academy, 25 "Changjiang Scholars", 1 fellow of State Department Degree Committee, 9 members of State Department Degree Committee, 31 distinguished national youth research scientists, 7 members (ranking 2nd nationwide) of "863 Projects" expert committee, and 57 excellent Department of Education research scientists.

The university has 64 undergraduate programs, 206 master programs, 109 doctoral programs, as well as 15 postdoctoral research sites. In the most recent official rankings summary, 6 programs are top 5 and another 6 programs are top 10 nationwide. Especially the School of Biomedical Science & Engineering ranks first place. The university has a top research ability. There are 10 National First-class Academic programs, 6 potential National First-class Academic Programs. 3 National Research Labs, 1 National Professional Lab, 2 National Engineering Research Centers, and 7 Department of Education First-class Labs.

In 2006, the research funds for the university is 600 million Chinese Yuan, which lists the 7th place in the country.

Rankings

Southeast University is one of the top 100 universities in scientific research and development in China. It has over 20 national or provincial research institutes, with a number of key research bases. Over the last decade, it has completed more than 1000 research projects, of which over 500 have been awarded the national, provincial or municipal science and technology prizes. Its research fund exceeded 1.1 billion yuan in 2010, which placed 11th nationwide. The SEU Architecture Design and Research Institute, which is one of the few national first-class design institutes, has undertaken various major projects. The SEU-affiliated Zhongda Hospital was set up in 1935 and rated as "Class A Grade 3" by the Ministry of Public Health.

In 2007, Southeast University was listed 443rd among world universities. In 2010, according to a leading scientific journal "Nature" (Nature Publishing Index 2010 China), the report ranked Southeast University as the 8th among all domestic research institutes.

In 2010 QS top university ranking, it was ranked: 87th overall among Asian universities, 76th in engineering and I.T. among Asian universities, 301–350th in engineering and I.T worldwide. In 2016, Southeast University was ranked 201–300 in ARWU World University Ranking, and 20th in ARWU Field - Engineering Ranking. In 2017 Chinese national university ranking edited by Wu Shulian, Southeast University was placed 14th in the national university ranking in China, together with other 22 universities as China's top-tier national universities.

In 2020 ARWU World University Ranking, Southeast University's global rank rose to 101–150, and national rank as 7–13.

Campus

There are 3 main campuses of Southeast University namely Sipailou Campus, Jiulonghu campus and Dingjiaqiao campus. Sipailou (Xuanwu District) and Dingjiaqiao campus (Gulou district) are in Nanjing city and Jiulonghu campus in suburbs of Nanjing (Jiangning District).

The Sipailou Campus of Southeast University is the flagship campus that is inherited from National Central University. It is located at 2 Sipailou, Nanjing, China. In 1988, Pukou Campus which located in Pukou Campus across the Yangtze River was opened as another site mainly for the education of first and second year students (freshman and sophomores). However, in 2008 Pukou Campus was separated from Southeast University and was then acquired by Cheng Xian Institute.

In 2001, SEU acquired three other colleges in Nanjing. They are: Nanjing Railway Medical College, Nanjing College of Advanced Transportation, as well as Nanjing Advanced School of Geology. Nanjing Railway Medical College became the School of Medicine at Southeast University after it merged with SEU. The medical school is located in Dingjiaqiao.

In 2005, when Jiulonghu Campus, located in Jiangning District, was founded, the authority of Pukou Campus was transferred to the Chengxian College of Southeast University. Most of the undergraduate students and master students are studying at Jiulonghu Campus currently. After Jiulonghu Campus was opened, the Sipailou Campus basically includes some most important research institutes and administrations of the university.
Jiulonghu Campus is situated in the south of the Jiangning Technology Development District, to the east of Suyuan Avenue, west of Shuanglong Street, and south of Jiyin Street. It is around 20 kilometers away from the Sipailou Campus, with an area of 3749mu. The architecture design of Jiulonghu Campus follows the basis of Southeast University's culture, characterized in the combination of public teaching and research which compromises the merit of Chinese and Western styles, forming a green and active university community. The total building area in Jiulonghu Campus is 574 thousand square meters with the investment of 1.6 billion yuan.

Schools and departments

 Office of President
 Education Foundation
 University history
 Chien-Shiung Wu Memorial Hall
 Galileo training and application research center
 General Alumni Association of Southeast University
 School of Architecture
 School of Mechanical Engineering
 School of Energy & Environment Engineering
 School of Information Science & Engineering
 School of Civil Engineering
 School of Electronic Science & Engineering
 Department of Mathematics & Applied Mechanics
 School of Automation
 School of Computer Science & Engineering
 Department of Physics
 School of Biological Science & Medical Engineering
 School of Material Science & Engineering
 School of Economics & Management
 School of Electrical Power Engineering
 School of Foreign Languages
 School of Chemistry and Chemical Engineering
 School of Transportation Engineering
 School of Instrument Science & Engineering
 School of Art
 School of Humanities
 School of Law
 School of Medicine
 School of Public Health
 Department of Physical Education
 School of Continuing Education
 College of Software Engineering
 Cheng Xian College
 College of Integrated Circuit
 Wu Jian Xiong (Chien-Shiung Wu) College
School of Cyber Science & Engineering

Notable people and alumni

Politicians
 Chiang Kai-shek, President of Republic of China
 Huang Wei, vice chairman of Xinjiang Uygur Autonomous Region, the former Vice Minister of Construction (Civil Engineering)
 Zhenya Wang, Australian senator

Scientists

 Zhang Zhushan, Chemist
 Wu Chien-Shiung, physicist, known as the "Oriental Marie Curie", with β-decay experiments demonstrating that in the weak interaction, symmetry is not conserved
 Huang Weilu, missile engineer, recipient of the Two Bombs, One Satellite Medal
 Ren Xinmin, missile engineer, recipient of the Two Bombs, One Satellite Medal
 Mao Yisheng, bridge engineer
 Zhou Ren, Metallurgy and ceramics scientist
 Liu Dunzhen, architect, one of the "Five Masters of Architecture"
 Yang Tingbao, architect, one of the "Five Masters of Architecture"
 Qi Kang, Architect
 Wu Liangyong, Architect
 Xia Jianbai, mapping scientist
 Fang Jun, Geophysicist
 Chen Wenxi, Machinery expert
 Yang Liming, Nuclear physicist
 Su Hua-Qin, Foundry and metallurgy scientist
 Shu Guangji, materials scientist
 Wu Zhongwei, Materials scientist
 Qian Zhonghan, Automatic control scientist
 Zhang Zhongjun, Control theorist
 Ni Shangda, Electronic scientist
 Hu Minggui, Electronic scientist
 Qian Fengzhang, Electronic scientist
 Tian Binggeng, Electronic scientist
 He Zhenya, Information scientist
 Su Lang, Information scientist
 Liu Shenggang, Electronic scientist
 Wei Yu, Electronic scientist
 Xia Peisu, computer scientist
 Ni Guangnan, computer scientist
 Huang Yushan, Aviation scientist
 Gao Hong, Chemist
 Liang Xiaotian, chemist
 Min Enze, chemist
 Shi Jun, chemist
 Jin Baozhen, Mechanics Scientist
 Min Guirong, aerospace engineer
 Ding Henggao, high-precision machinery expert
 Yang Huanming, Geneticist
 He Lin, Geneticist
 Zhengxu Zhao, Chief scientist of space mission visualization & control, Professor & Fellow of British Royal Society of Arts (FRSA)
 Hans-Werner Gessmann, Clinical Psychologist, founder and pioneer of humanistic psychodrama
Harry Shum, Computer scientist, Executive Vice President of Artificial Intelligence & Research at Microsoft.

Others

 Yung Ho Chang, Owner of 'Architecture Prize' awarded by American Academy of Arts, Professor of the U.S. Massachusetts Institute of Technology (MIT), Department of Architecture (Department of Architecture, 81)
 Yuan Chun: Graduate from Southeast University, studied in Germany, a pioneer to promote the militarization education in China, The first to open female college students swimming lessons which abolished the old Chinese prohibition of female college students to swim
 Cheng Dengke: Graduate from Southeast University, studied in Germany, a pioneer to promote the militarization education in China, a pioneer Chinese women's gymnastics
 Cheng Taining, Chief Architect in Chinese United Engineering Corporation, Host of Chinese United Cheng Training Architectural Design Institute(56)
 Jinjiong Hua, U.S. President's Award winner, the U.S. National Science Foundation award winner (Mechanical Engineering)
 Ye Mao, director of Cornell University (administered by the College of Accounting)
 Hualong Xing, China Electronic Information Industry Group Corporation chairman Sang Fei (Radio Engineering)
 Wu Haijun, Shenzhen New World Industrial Co., Ltd., Shenzhen Hasee chairman (Master of Power Engineering)
 Harry Shum, Microsoft's senior vice president and chief scientist of the National Natural Science Foundation judges (Youth Class)
 Mr. Xu, Kingdee International Software Group Co., Ltd. Chairman and chief executive officer
 Lin Jiaxi, CEO of IFC investment adviser
 Min Yu, Ideal Group (Asia) Co., Ltd. Founder
 Meng Jianmin, China Architecture Design Master, president of Shenzhen Construction General Institute
 ZHANG Gui-ping, chairman of Suning Universal Group (Suning Group) ZHANG Gui-ping
 Chenxing Han, South East Qixia Construction (Group) Company Party branch secretary and general manager, senior engineer
 Sun Chao, chairman of Sun Dairy Co., Ltd. (Electronic Engineering)
Li Zhi, music artist banned from PRC for references to 1989 Tiananmen Square protests

References

External links

 Official Website 东南大学 
 Official website 
 University History
 3d map of SEU 

 
Universities and colleges in Nanjing
Universities in China with English-medium medical schools
Major National Historical and Cultural Sites in Jiangsu
Universities established in the 20th century
Educational institutions established in 1902
Project 211
Project 985
Plan 111
Vice-ministerial universities in China
1902 establishments in China